Striker is a Canadian heavy metal band from Edmonton, Alberta, formed in 2007. The band's early material had a sound influenced more by old school thrash metal, but their more recent material has a more melodic sound influenced by traditional heavy metal.

Their album Play to Win won the Juno Award for Heavy Metal Album of the Year at the Juno Awards of 2020.

Members

Current 
 Dan Cleary – vocals (2007–present)
 Tim Brown – guitar (2013–present)
 John Simon Fallon – guitar (2016–2017, 2022–present)
 Pete Klassen – bass (2019–present)
 Jono Webster – drums (2019–present)

Former 
 Chris Segger – guitar (2007–2014, 2017–2022)
 Dave Arnold – bass (2007–2013)
 Dave Grafton – bass (2007)
 Tyson Travnik – drums (2007–2008)
 Ian Sandercock – guitar (2007–2013)
 Magnus Burdeniuk- drums (2008–2010)
 Adam Brown – drums (2010–2019)
 William "Wild Bill" Wallace – bass (2014–2019)
 Trent Halliwell – guitar (2015–2016)

Timeline

Discography 
 Road Warrior (2009, Iron Kodex)
 Eyes in the Night (2010, Iron Kodex)
 Armed to the Teeth (2012, Napalm)
 Eyes in the Night + Road Warrior (2013, Bickee Music)
 City of Gold (2014, Napalm)
 Stand in the Fire (2016, Record Breaking)
 Striker (2017, Record Breaking)
 Play to Win (2018, Record Breaking)

References

External links 

 Official website
 

Canadian heavy metal musical groups
Canadian hard rock musical groups
Musical groups from Edmonton
Musical groups established in 2007
2007 establishments in Alberta
Juno Award for Heavy Metal Album of the Year winners